The Rugby Players Association (RPA) is a trade union representing athletes who currently play or have played rugby union in England at a professional or semi-professional level. The RPA  is the representative body and collective voice of professional rugby players in England and represents more than 800 male and female current rugby players, as well as more than 400 former players.

RPA members enjoy a wide range of benefits, including: independent representation; legal advice; personal and professional development; playing insurance; education; confidential counselling; transition support; and much more. Members can also access the support of our official charity, Restart, in the event of serious illness, injury or hardship.

The RPA has also acted as the exclusive commercial representative of the England Team since 2004 and performs the following duties on behalf of Team England: Negotiation of the Elite Players Squad Contract, England and Saxons match fees, England team win bonuses and Image Rights payments with the RFU. In August 2021, it was announced that the RPA would also act as exclusive commercial representatives for the England Women.

The RPA was founded by professional player Damian Hopley, who was forced to early retirement after an injury. 

The RPA announced that Hopley was to leave the organisation after 24 years in charge of the company. His last day was on Monday 15 August, with a visit to Wasps.

On Monday 16th January 2023, it was announced that Christian Day, was elected the new General Secretary of the RPA, following an election to the membership.

See also

 Rugby Union Players Association, Australian national association for players' interests formed in October 1995
 Rugby Players Ireland, Irish national association for players' interests formed in October 2001
 Welsh Rugby Players Association, Welsh national association for players' interests formed in 2003

References

External links 
Official site

1998 establishments in England
Trade unions established in 1998
Rugby union players representative bodies
 
Sports organisations of the United Kingdom
Trade unions in the United Kingdom